Amanita luteofusca is a species of Amanita from South Australia.

References

External links
 
 

luteofusca